Hylodes glaber is a species of frog in the family Hylodidae.
It is endemic to Brazil.
Its natural habitats are subtropical or tropical moist montane forest, subtropical or tropical high-altitude grassland, and rivers.
It is threatened by habitat loss.

References

Hylodes
Endemic fauna of Brazil
Amphibians of Brazil
Taxonomy articles created by Polbot
Amphibians described in 1926